Hasifah Nassuna (born 16 February 1998) is a Ugandan footballer who plays as an attacking midfielder for Kampala queens and the Uganda women's national team.

Early life
Nassuna was born in Mityana and raised in the Central Region. Her mother is Annet Nakimbugwe.

Club career
Nassuna has played for UCU Lady Cardinals in Uganda.

International career
Nassuna capped for Uganda at senior level during the 2021 COSAFA Women's Championship.

International goals
Scores and results list Uganda goal tally first

References

External links

1998 births
Living people
Uganda Christian University alumni
People from Mityana District
People from Central Region, Uganda
Ugandan women's footballers
Women's association football midfielders
Uganda women's international footballers
20th-century Ugandan women
21st-century Ugandan women